Indraja is an Indian actress. 

Indraja may also refer to:
 Indraja, the god Jupiter in list of Lithuanian gods and mythological figures
 Indraja, a daughter of Indra in Brahmanic astrology 
 Indraja, a daughter of Perun, a Marvel Comics character
 Indraja, festival to Indra observed by Pawra subtribe among Bhils in India
 Indraja (इनद्राजा), ayurvedic medicine, seeds of Holarrhena pubescens